is a Japanese former competitive figure skater who competed in both singles and pair skating. As a pair skater, she competed with Alexei Tikhonov for Japan. They are two-time Japanese national champions and won the bronze medal at the 1993 NHK Trophy. As a single skater, she competed internationally on the junior and senior levels.

She turned professional in 2000.

Competitive highlights

Singles
1990
Japanese Junior Nationals-2nd
1991
Japanese Junior Nationals-3rd
World Junior Championships-11th 
1993
Japanese Junior Nationals-3rd
1994
Japanese Junior Nationals-2nd
1995
Japanese Senior Nationals-7th
1999
1999 Winter Asian Games-7th

Pair skating
(with Alexei Tikhonov for Japan)

References
 Pairs on Ice: Kawasaki & Tikhonov

1977 births
Japanese female pair skaters
Japanese female single skaters
Living people
Figure skaters at the 1999 Asian Winter Games